The phonology of Danish is similar to that of the other closely related Scandinavian languages, Swedish and Norwegian, but it also has distinct features setting it apart. For example, Danish has a suprasegmental feature known as stød which is a kind of laryngeal phonation that is used phonemically. It also exhibits extensive lenition of plosives, which is noticeably more common than in the neighboring languages. Because of these and a few other features, spoken Danish can be challenging for Norwegians and Swedes to understand without training, although they can easily read written Danish.

Consonants 
Danish has at least 17 consonant phonemes:

Beyond morphological boundaries,  may also appear as the result of an optional assimilation of  before .

 are apical alveolar , although some speakers realize  dentally.

 are voiceless aspirated, with  also affricated: . In some varieties of standard Danish (but not the Copenhagen dialect),  is just aspirated, without the affrication.

 are voiceless unaspirated . In syllable codas, weak, partial voicing may accompany them especially when between voiced sounds. Intervocalic  may be realized as a voiced flap , as in nordisk  'Nordic'.

 is only weakly fricated. Between vowels, it is often voiced .

 can be a voiced fricative , but is most often a voiced approximant .

 – the so-called "soft d" – is a velarized laminal alveolar approximant . Very rarely,  can be realized as a fricative.

Syllable-initially,  is a voiced uvular fricative  or, more commonly, an approximant . According to Nina Grønnum, the fricative variant is voiceless . Its precise place of articulation has been described as pharyngeal, or more broadly, as "supra-pharyngeal". When emphasizing a word, word-initial  may be realized as a voiced uvular fricative trill .

The alveolar realization is considered non-standard, even in classical opera singing – it is probably the only European language in which this is the case.

 are voiceless  after , where the aspiration is realized as devoicing of the following consonant, so that  is normally realized as an alveolo-palatal affricate .

A voiced velar continuant  occurred distinctively in older Standard Danish. Some older speakers still use it in high register, most often as an approximant .

 is elided after , and possibly also after , and less commonly after . Similarly,  is elided after , and possibly also after , and less commonly after .

Vowels

Modern Standard Danish has around 20 different vowel qualities. These vowels are shown below in a narrow transcription.

 and  occur only in unstressed syllables and thus can only be short. Long vowels may have stød, thus making it possible to distinguish 30 different vowels in stressed syllables. However, vowel length and stød are most likely features of the syllable rather than of the vowel.

The 26 vowel phonemes of Standard Danish (14 short and 12 long) correspond to 21 morphophonemes (11 short and 10 long).

The three way distinction in front rounded vowels  is upheld only before nasals, e.g.  synes, synds, søns ('seems', 'sin's', 'son's').

However, a two-phoneme interpretation can be justified with reference to the unexpected vowel quality in words like andre  'others' or anderledes  'different', and an increasing number of loanwords.

Some phonemes and phones that only occur in unstressed position often merge with full phonemes and phones:

The vowel system is unstable, and according to a study by Ejstrup & Hansen (2004), the contemporary spoken language might be experiencing a merger of several of these vowels. The following vowel pairs may be merged by some speakers (only vowels not adjacent to |r| were analyzed):

Schwa-assimilation

  assimilates to preceding long vowels:  →  die 'nurse',  →  due 'pigeon'.
In innovative varieties, the vowels may become shorter: .
 It is longer after a short vowel than after a long one:  →  bade 'bathe',  →  hule 'cave',  →  spidde 'spear',  →  kulde 'cold'.
 When  is placed between two sonorant consonants, the second becomes syllabic:  →  saddel 'saddle',  →  hyldet 'praised'.
 The place of a syllabic nasal assimilates to that of the preceding consonant:  →  lappen 'the patch',  →  lakken 'varnishes'.

In casual speech,  may also be elided after an obstruent. If that occurs after a long vowel, the syllable with the elided  may be retained by lengthening the vowel preceding the consonant:  →  håbe 'hope'.

Glottal stop insertion
A word-initial vowel may be preceded by a glottal stop  when preceded by a vowel.

Prosody
Stress,  and intonation are prosodic features used in Danish phonology. Durational distinctions are also present, but usually considered part of the vowel phonemes.

Stress
Unlike the neighboring Scandinavian languages Swedish and Norwegian, the prosody of Danish does not have phonemic pitch. Stress is phonemic and distinguishes words like billigst  ('cheapest') and bilist  ('car driver'). In syntactic phrases, verbs lose their stress (and stød, if any) with an object without a definite or indefinite article: e.g. ˈJens ˈspiser et ˈbrød  ('Jens eats a loaf') ~ ˈJens spiser ˈbrød  ('Jens eats bread'). In names, only the surname is stressed, e.g.  Johanne Luise Heiberg.

Stød

In a number of words, stressed syllables with a long vowel or with a short vowel and a sonorant may exhibit a prosodic feature called stød ('thrust'). Acoustically, vowels with stød tend to be a little shorter and feature creaky voice. Historically, this feature operated as a redundant aspect of stress on monosyllabic words that had either a long vowel or final voiced consonant. Since the creation of new monosyllabic words, this association with monosyllables is no longer as strong. Some other tendencies include:
Polysyllabic words with the nominal definite suffix -et may exhibit stød
Polysyllabic loanwords with final stress on either a long vowel or a vowel with a final sonorant typically feature stød

Diphthongs with an underlying long vowel always have stød.

Intonation

Danish intonation reflects the combination of the stress group, sentence type and prosodic phrase, where the stress group is the main intonation unit. In Copenhagen Standard Danish, the stress group mainly has a certain pitch pattern that reaches its lowest peak on the stressed syllable followed by its highest peak on the immediately following unstressed syllable, after which it declines gradually until the next stress group. The peaks of stress groups in succession will generally be lower later in the utterance. However, the pitch pattern is placed differently in relation to the stressed syllable in other varieties of Danish The pitch pattern of an utterance can also vary depending on the type of utterance, with declaratives having a steep falling pitch and questions displaying a level pitch, with other categories in between. Nina Grønnum is known for her research on Danish intonation showing this. 

Pitch in Danish can also reflect the interactional function of the utterance or other unit: The climax of a storytelling can be marked through a wide pitch pattern while pitch movements at the end of a turn can be used for the timing of turn-taking. Note that the realization of  also affects pitch, while some varieties also realize it primarily with pitch.

Text sample 
The sample text is an indistinct reading of the first sentence of The North Wind and the Sun.

Orthographic version
Nordenvinden og solen kom engang i strid om, hvem af dem der var den stærkeste.

Broad phonetic transcription

References

Bibliography

Further reading

External links
 IPA for Danish 
 Overview of the Danish sound system 

phonology
Germanic phonologies